Ali Demirsoy Natural History Museum is a museum in Kemaliye, Turkey.

The museum is in the campus of Hacı Ali Akın Multi-Program Highschool in Kemaliye ilçe (district), of  Erzincan Province. Its founder is Professor Ali Demirsoy of Hacettepe University. It is supported by Tubitak (Scientific and Technological Research Council of Turkey).

Exhibited items
Exhibited items are the following:
 Various minerals and rocks 
 Gastropoda, bivalvia and echinodermata from Kemaliye area
 Single cell plants and animals (shown under microscope)
 Lichens, the earliest living forms on soil
 Algae from Kemaliye area
 Some invertebrates in formaldehyde and alcohol
 Herbarium and insects on panels
 Fishes in formaldehyde and alcohol 
 Amphibians in Formaldehyde and alcohol 
 Venomous snakes and other reptiles in formaldehyde and alcohol
 Birds in formaldehyde and alcohol
 Examples of stuffed mamalia such as bear, wolf, wildcat, marten, mountain goat, badger, squirrel, rodents etc.native to area.
 Herbarium of more than half of all plants native to Kemaliye area

The number of plant fossils is about 800 and insect fossils is about 2000. One of the recent additions to the museum is the elephant skeleton from Ankara Zoo.

References

Natural history museums in Turkey
Buildings and structures in Erzincan Province
Kemaliye
Museums established in 2006
2006 establishments in Turkey